Wipac is a British automotive engineering company based in Buckingham. The company resulted from a merger in 1941 of the British subsidiary of the American Witherbee Igniter Company (Wico) and British spark plug manufacturer Pacy to become the Wico-Pacy in Bletchley before eventually becoming the Wipac brand which became well known in the UK for car and motorbike accessories including driving lamps and windscreen wiper blades. Wipac moved to Buckingham in 1959 with 500 employees.

In 1998 Wipac was acquired by Carclo and in recent years became specifically known for LED lights for vehicles including the high mounted stop lamp for the 1995 Cadillac Catera, one of the first multifunction LED tail lamps for the 2001 Porsche Carrera GT, and the front and rear lights for the 2011 Lamborghini Aventador.

The company manufacturers vehicle antennas, producing 1.4 million in 2005.

In 2007 Wipac acquired High Wycombe based Ultra Auto Design.

In December 2019 the automotive lighting business of Wipac was acquired by Anrui Optoelectronics Ltd of China, itself part of San'an Optoelectronics. The optics, eyecare and ultra brands were retained within Carclo.

References

Companies based in Buckinghamshire
Manufacturing companies established in 1948
Auto parts suppliers of the United Kingdom